Kenyūsha (硯友社) was a writers' society in Meiji era Japan, chiefly led by Ozaki Kōyō. Its other members included Kawakami Bizan.

Meiji period
Japanese writers' organizations
Japanese literature